Liptál is a municipality and village in Vsetín District in the Zlín Region of the Czech Republic. It has about 1,500 inhabitants.

Twin towns – sister cities

Liptál is twinned with:
 Cañas, Costa Rica
 Tilarán, Costa Rica

References

Villages in Vsetín District
Moravian Wallachia